Asura peloa is a moth of the family Erebidae first described by Charles Swinhoe in 1904. It is found on Sumatra, Peninsular Malaysia, Java and Borneo.

References

peloa
Moths described in 1904
Moths of Asia